Brigadier Sir Geoffrey Paul Hardy-Roberts  (16 May 1907 – 9 April 1997) was a British Army officer, Conservative politician and courtier, who served as Master of the Household between 1967 and 1973. He was High Sheriff of Sussex in 1965.

Biography
Hardy-Roberts was born Geoffrey Paul Francis Jacques Roberts, the son of Alfred Walter Roberts and Marguerite, the daughter of Paul Nathan who had changed his name to Hardy. Geoffrey changed his surname by deed poll in 1937. He was educated at Eton College and the Royal Military College, Sandhurst, before commissioning into the 9th Queen's Royal Lancers in 1926. He initially served in India and was promoted to lieutenant in 1929. In 1933, he returned to the United Kingdom and served as Adjutant of his regiment between 1933 and 1935. He retired from the army with the rank of captain in 1937. On 28 April 1938, he was elected unopposed to the London County Council to fill a casual vacancy. He sat as a Municipal Reform Party councillor representing Lewisham West and held the seat until elections were resumed after the Second World War in 1946.

Hardy-Roberts' commission was reactivated in 1939 following the outbreak of war. He was promoted to lieutenant colonel in 1941 and that same year was invested as an Officer of the Order of the British Empire. He saw active service in the Western Desert Campaign and the Italian Campaign, before working as Chief of Staff to General Sir Miles Dempsey between 1943 and 1945. In 1944, Hardy-Roberts was appointed a CBE and mentioned in dispatches while serving in the North-West Europe Campaign of 1944–1945, and he was made a Companion of the Order of the Bath in 1945. He also made an Officer of the Legion of Merit by the United States government.

In the 1945 United Kingdom general election, Hardy Roberts stood as the Conservative candidate in Wimbledon, but narrowly lost the usually safe Conservative seat to Arthur Palmer of the Labour Party. Between 1946 and 1967 he worked as Secretary-Superintendent of Middlesex Hospital and was a Justice of the Peace in Sussex. He resigned his commission from the Regular Reserve of Army Officers in 1958 and was granted the rank of brigadier. In 1964, he served as Deputy Lieutenant for West Sussex and he became High Sheriff of Sussex in 1965.

In 1967, he was appointed Master of the Household of Elizabeth II, serving in the position until 1973. From 1967 to his death in 1997, Hardy-Roberts was also an Extra Equerry to the Queen. He was created a Knight Commander of the Royal Victorian Order in 1972.

Honour

Foreign honour
  : Honorary Commander of the Order of Loyalty to the Crown of Malaysia (P.S.M.) (1972)

References

1907 births
1997 deaths
9th Queen's Royal Lancers officers
British Army personnel of World War II
Commanders of the Order of the British Empire
Companions of the Order of the Bath
Conservative Party (UK) councillors
Conservative Party (UK) parliamentary candidates
Deputy Lieutenants of Sussex
Equerries
Graduates of the Royal Military College, Sandhurst
High Sheriffs of Sussex
Knights Commander of the Royal Victorian Order
Masters of the Household
Officers of the Legion of Merit
People educated at Eton College
Honorary Commanders of the Order of Loyalty to the Crown of Malaysia